Vertiginidae, common name the whorl snails, is a family of minute, air-breathing land snails, terrestrial pulmonate gastropod molluscs or micromollusks in the superfamily Pupilloidea.

Distribution 
The distribution of the Vertiginidae is in the Northern Hemisphere: North America (60 species), Eurasia (30 species), North and central Africa (3-5 species). That gives a total of approximately 93-95 species.

Ecology 
Snails in this family inhabit habitats ranging from forests to semi-open and open habitats with various different kinds of substrate cover, vegetation and humidity. They feed on microflora - bacteria and fungi - growing on dead and living plants.

Taxonomy 
The following three subfamilies were recognized in the taxonomy of Bouchet & Rocroi (2005):
 Subfamily Vertigininae Fitzinger, 1833
 Tribe Vertiginini Fitzinger, 1833
 Tribe Truncatellinini Steenberg, 1925 - synonyms: Truncatellininae; Columellinae Schileyko, 1998 - raised in 2016 to family level Truncatellinidae
 Subfamily Gastrocoptinae Pilsbry, 1918 - synonyms: Hypselostomatinae Zilch, 1959; Aulacospirinae Zilch, 1959
 Subfamily Nesopupinae Steenberg, 1925 - synonym: Cylindrovertillidae Iredale, 1940

Genera
Genera in the family Vertiginidae include:

Subfamily Vertigininae

Tribe Vertiginini
 Vertigo O. F. Müller, 1773 - the type genus of the family Vertiginidae

 Subfamily Nesopupinae
 Bothriopupa Pilsbry, 1898
 Bothriopupa tenuidens (C. B. Adams, 1845)
 Costigo O. Boettger, 1891
 Cylindrovertilla O. Boettger, 1881
 Glandicula F. Sandberger, 1875 †
 Helenopupa Pilsbry & C. M. Cooke, 1920
 Indopupa Pilsbry & C. M. Cooke, 1920
 Insulipupa Pilsbry & C. M. Cooke, 1920
 Lyropupa Pilsbry, 1900
 Minacilla H. Nordsieck, 2014 †
 Negulopsis H. Nordsieck, 2014 †
 Nesopupa Pilsbry, 1900 - the type genus of the subfamily Nesopupinae
 Nesopuparia Pilsbry, 1926
 Nesopupilla Pilsbry & C. M. Cooke, 1920
 Nesoropupa Gargominy, 2008
 Paracraticula Oppenheim, 1890 †
 Pronesopupa Iredale, 1913
 Trigonopupa H. Nordsieck, 2014 †
 Staurodon Lowe, 1852: synonym of Vertigo O. F. Müller, 1773
 Subfamily ?
 Acmopupa O. Boettger, 1889 †
 Propupa Stworzewicz & Pokryszko, 2006 †
 Pseudelix O. Boettger, 1889 †
 Tetoripupa Isaji, 2010 †
 Sterkia Pilsbry, 1898: synonym of Vertigo O. F. Müller, 1773

References
This article incorporates public domain text from the reference.

 Schileyko, A. A. (1998). Treatise on Recent terrestrial pulmonate molluscs. Part 2. Gastrocoptidae, Hypselostomatidae, Vertiginidae, Truncatellinidae, Pachnodidae, Enidae, Sagdidae. Ruthenica. Supplement 2: 129-261. Moskva

External links

 The Vertiginidae of Poland
 Fitzinger, L.J. (1833). Systematisches Verzeichniß der im Erzherzogthume Oesterreich vorkommenden Weichthiere, als Prodrom einer Fauna derselben. Beiträge zur Landeskunde Oesterreichs's unter der Enns, 3: 88-122. Wien